Schaliach was a Christian metal band formed by Peter Dalbakk and Ole Børud from Hamar, Norway. Dalbakk served as the band's vocalist, while Børud handled all the instrumentation. The band released one studio album, Sonrise, in 1996 through Petroleum Records. Three songs from that recording were then featured on the Rowe Productions compilation album Northern Lights: Norwegian Metal Compilation, which was also released in 1996. The band also contributed the song "Purple Filter" to the compilation album In the Shadow of Death: A Scandinavian Extreme Music Compilation, released in 2000 through Endtime Productions. Dalbakk was also part of the unblack metal band Vardøger, and Børud had joined the progressive death metal band Extol and also started a career as a solo artist. The two artists would years later, in 2015, team up again to found the progressive death metal project Fleshkiller. The genre performed by the band was described variously as doom metal, death metal, death-doom, gothic metal, black metal, melodic death metal, and progressive metal. Børud's guitar work was strongly influenced by classical music, with one reviewer describing it as a "metal symphony." Its lyrics were explicitly Christian, drawing heavily from the Bible and emphasizing the love of God for all humans. Schaliach has been compared to the output from Extol, Amorphis, Metallica, Solitude Aeturnus, Dream Theater, Threshold, Shadow Gallery, and Teramaze. Most critics were favorable to Sonrise — it was rated highly by HM writer Matt Morrow and by two reviewers from the Christian website The Phantom Tollbooth, and described by the webzine Chronicles of Chaos as "excellent". However, Rock Hard was less favorable and considered Schaliach boring.

Discography 

 Sonrise - 1996
 Northern Lights: Norwegian Metal Compilation - 1996
 "The Last Creed"
 "You Maintain"
 "Coming of the Dawn"
 In the Shadow of Death - A Scandinavian Extreme Music Compilation - 2000: Contributed "Purple Filter"

Band members 

 Peter Dalbakk – vocals
 Ole Børud – guitar, bass, drums

References 

Musicians from Hamar
1995 establishments in Norway
Musical groups established in 1995
Norwegian Christian metal musical groups
Norwegian melodic death metal musical groups
Norwegian doom metal musical groups
Norwegian death metal musical groups
Norwegian progressive metal musical groups
Norwegian gothic metal musical groups
Norwegian black metal musical groups
Musical groups disestablished in 2000
2000 disestablishments in Norway